James Heath (born February 17, 1960) is an American former professional boxer who competed from 1985 to 1996. He twice challenged for the WBA cruiserweight title between 1994 and 1996.

Career
Heath turned professional in 1985, winning his debut against Jessie Brown in 3 rounds. Heath was given the opportunity to fight Orlin Norris for the WBA cruiserweight title in Mexico after 10 fights. Heath was knocked out in the second round. Heath's second world title shot came 2 years later against Nate Miller. The result was a 7th-round technical knockout going Miller's way. Shortly after Heath retired.

Heath also won the NABF cruiserweight title in 1995.

Professional boxing record

|-
|align="center" colspan=8|9 Wins (7 knockouts, 2 decisions), 4 Losses (3 knockouts, 1 decision), 2 Draws 
|-
| align="center" style="border-style: none none solid solid; background: #e3e3e3"|Result
| align="center" style="border-style: none none solid solid; background: #e3e3e3"|Record
| align="center" style="border-style: none none solid solid; background: #e3e3e3"|Opponent
| align="center" style="border-style: none none solid solid; background: #e3e3e3"|Type
| align="center" style="border-style: none none solid solid; background: #e3e3e3"|Round
| align="center" style="border-style: none none solid solid; background: #e3e3e3"|Date
| align="center" style="border-style: none none solid solid; background: #e3e3e3"|Location
| align="center" style="border-style: none none solid solid; background: #e3e3e3"|Notes
|-align=center
|Loss
|9–4–2
|align=left| Nate Miller
|TKO
|7
|31/08/1996
|align=left| Dublin, Ireland
|align=left|
|-
|Loss
|9–3–2
|align=left| Brian LaSpada
|TKO
|10
|26/01/1996
|align=left| Paradise, Nevada, U.S.
|align=left|
|-
|Win
|9–2–2
|align=left| Fabian Garcia
|TKO
|7
|22/02/1995
|align=left| Rochester, New York, U.S.
|align=left|
|-
|Win
|8–2–2
|align=left| John McClain
|PTS
|12
|27/01/1995
|align=left| Doraville, Georgia, U.S.
|align=left|
|-
|Loss
|7–2–2
|align=left| Orlin Norris
|KO
|2
|12/11/1994
|align=left| Mexico City, Mexico
|align=left|
|-
|Win
|7–1–2
|align=left| Willie Jake
|KO
|9
|09/07/1994
|align=left| Charlotte, North Carolina, U.S.
|align=left|
|-
|Win
|6–1–2
|align=left| J.B. Williamson
|TKO
|3
|19/02/1994
|align=left| Charlotte, North Carolina, U.S.
|align=left|
|-
|Win
|5–1–2
|align=left| Mike Waters
|KO
|1
|08/10/1993
|align=left| Charlotte, North Carolina, U.S.
|align=left|
|-
|Loss
|4–1–2
|align=left| Robert Daniels
|PTS
|10
|13/02/1993
|align=left| Miami, Florida, U.S.
|align=left|
|-
|Win
|4–0–2
|align=left| Reinaldo Gimenez
|TKO
|6
|12/12/1992
|align=left| Miami, Florida, U.S.
|align=left|
|-
|Win
|3–0–2
|align=left|Emmanuel Spence
|PTS
|6
|23/06/1992
|align=left| Tallahassee, Florida, U.S.
|align=left|
|-
|Win
|2–0–2
|align=left| Frankie Hines
|KO
|2
|02/05/1992
|align=left| Denver, North Carolina, U.S.
|align=left|
|-
|Draw
|1–0–2
|align=left| Danny Wofford
|PTS
|4
|24/10/1987
|align=left| Winston-Salem, North Carolina, U.S.
|align=left|
|-
|Draw
|1–0–1
|align=left| Maurice Moore
|PTS
|4
|07/10/1987
|align=left| Charlotte, North Carolina, U.S.
|align=left|
|-
|Win
|1–0
|align=left| Jessie Brown
|KO
|3
|28/03/1985
|align=left| Charleston, South Carolina, U.S.
|align=left|
|}

Personal life
Heath is a native of Monroe, North Carolina.

References

External links
 

Living people
1960 births
American male boxers
Cruiserweight boxers
Boxers from North Carolina
People from Monroe, North Carolina